Rudi may refer to:


People
Rudi (spiritual teacher)

Places
Rudi (Tanzanian ward)
Rudi, Iran (disambiguation)
Rudi, Soroca, a commune in Soroca district, Moldova
Rudi (river), a tributary of the Pârâul Galben in Gorj County, Romania

Other uses
Rudi (band), a punk rock band
, a Hansa A Type cargo ship
Rudi, a variant of Rudy, a diminutive of Rudolf
Revision using distal inflow (RUDI)

See also
 Rudy (disambiguation)